Mazikaleh Poshteh (also Romanized as Māzīkaleh Poshteh; also known as Māzūkalā Poshteh) is a village in Owshiyan Rural District, Chaboksar District, Rudsar County, Gilan Province, Iran. At the 2006 census, its population was 17, in 6 families.

References 

Populated places in Rudsar County